Bryan L. Roth is the Michael Hooker Distinguished Professor of Protein Therapeutics and Translational Proteomics, University of North Carolina School of Medicine.  He is recognized for his discoveries and inventions in the general areas of molecular pharmacology, GPCR structure, and function and synthetic neurobiology.  He is a member of the American Academy of Arts and Sciences (AAAS) and the National Academy of Medicine of the National Academy of Sciences (NAM)

Education 
Roth earned his B.A. in biology from Carroll College in 1977 and his M.D. and Ph.D. in biochemistry from Saint Louis University in 1983. After postdoctoral training at the National Institute of Mental Health (NIMH), he completed a psychiatry residency and fellowship at Stanford University in 1991. In 2007 he was appointed as the Michael Hooker Distinguished Professor of Protein Therapeutics and Translational Proteomics, UNC School of Medicine.

Research 
Roth has made contributions to the fields of G protein coupled receptor (GPCR) pharmacology and neurobiology, particularly related to the function of serotonin and opioid receptors. His laboratory reported the structure of a serotonin receptor bound to the hallucinogenic drug, LSD. Other major works include identification of new probes and tools to detect GPCRs, obtained through directed evolution in animal cells, developing receptors activated solely by a synthetic ligand (DREADDs), a chemogenetic platform used to direct selective, dose-dependent activation of a specific G protein subtype in vivo. Thomas Insel, then Director of NIMH, stated in 2014 that DREADDs were one of the most important breakthrough technologies for the NIH brain initiative. and have been used by more than a thousand labs for interrogating neural circuits responsible for simple and complex behaviors in animals.

Awards and recognition 
Roth’s work has been recognized by Science Signaling as one of the ‘Signaling Breakthroughs of ‘2014’ and 2016. His DREADD technology was highlighted as one of the important advances in the past 10 years in Nature Chemical Biology. Roth’s chemical biology discoveries have been highlighted by NIMH as one of the ‘Top 10 Research Advances of 2011’.
Roth is a member of the American Academy of Arts and Sciences (AAAS) and the National Academy of Medicine of the National Academy of Sciences (NAM). 
He received the Goodman and Gilman Award in Receptor Pharmacology from the American Society for Pharmacology and Experimental Therapeutics and was a  2018 Society for Neuroscience Presidential Special Lecture.

References 

Year of birth missing (living people)
Living people
Saint Louis University alumni
Carroll College (Montana) alumni
University of North Carolina faculty
American pharmacologists
Members of the National Academy of Medicine